Tamara Gorski is a Canadian actress. She is of Ukrainian descent.

Filmography

References

External links
 
 Official website

Canadian film actresses
Canadian television actresses
Living people
1968 births
Canadian people of Ukrainian descent